Jelena Kostanić and Henrieta Nagyová were the defending champions, but they both chose not to compete that year.

Liezel Huber and Magdalena Maleeva won in the final 3–6, 6–4, 6–2 against Eleni Daniilidou and Francesca Schiavone.

Seeds

  Liezel Huber / Magdalena Maleeva (champions)
  Tina Križan / Katarina Srebotnik (quarterfinals)
  Kristie Boogert / Magüi Serna (semifinals)
  Caroline Dhenin / Rossana Neffa-de los Ríos (quarterfinals)

Draw

External links
Draw

JandS Cup - Doubles
Warsaw Open